The Fantastic Voyages of Sinbad the Sailor is an American animated television series based on the Arabian Nights story of Sinbad the Sailor and produced by Fred Wolf Films that aired beginning February 2, 1998 on Cartoon Network.

The series featured Sinbad as a teenager, with an exotic cat cub (Kulak) and a young boy (Hakeem) as constant companions.

Cast 
 Bob Bergen
 Jim Cummings
 Melissa Disney
 Eric Jacklin
 Robert Ridgely
 Kath Soucie

Additional voices 

 Jack Angel
 Jeff Bennett
 Gregg Berger
 Mary Kay Bergman
 Susan Blu
 Earl Boen
 Hamilton Camp
 Phillip Lewis Clarke
 Townsend Coleman
 Michael Corbett
 Jennifer Darling
 Michael Donovan
 Paul Eiding
 Jeannie Elias
 Stephanie Faracy
 Quinton Flynn
 Joan Gerber
 Ed Gilbert

 Jennifer Hale
 Phil Hayes
 Charles Howerton
 Harry Hutchinson
 Nick Jameson
 Pat Musick
 Jenny Parsons
 Roger Rose
 John Rubinow
 Kevin Schon
 Glenn Shadix
 Susan Silo
 Warren Sroka
 Doug Stone
 Paula Tiso
 Billy West
 Fred Wolf

References

External links 
 
 

1996 American television series debuts
1998 American television series endings
1990s American animated television series
American children's animated action television series
American children's animated adventure television series
American children's animated fantasy television series
Films based on Sinbad the Sailor
Cartoon Network original programming
Teen animated television series
Television series by Warner Bros. Television Studios